The Brügger & Thomet TP380 is a semi automatic pistol manufactured by B&T. The weapon is a scaled down variant of the MP9.

Overview
The Brügger & Thomet TP380 is a semi automatic .380 ACP calibre semi-automatic pistol using a simple blowback operation. The weapon uses high impact polymer and transparent polymer double column/double stack magazines. Barrel is also threaded for suppressors.

See also
List of pistols

References

.380 ACP semi-automatic pistols
Simple blowback firearms